Michael G. Flood is an Australian sociologist and an associate professor at the Queensland University of Technology School of Justice. Flood gained his doctorate in gender and sexuality studies from the Australian National University. His areas of research are on violence against women, fathering, pro-feminism, domestic violence, the effects of pornography on young people, safe sex among heterosexual men, men's movements as a backlash to the feminist movement, men's relationships with each other and with women, homophobia, men's health, and gender justice. He is a regular contributor to and is regularly quoted in the media on these and other issues.

Flood is a co-editor of the International Encyclopedia of Men and Masculinities, and the author of numerous academic papers on issues related to men and gender. Flood has also worked as a pro-feminist educator and activist, addressing men's violence against women. He coordinates, edits and contributes to XY, a pro-feminist website providing a range of commentary and research on men and masculinities, male sexuality, feminism, the men's movement and male violence from a feminist perspective.  He also coordinates The Men's Bibliography, an online collection of over 22,000 works on men, masculinities, and gender.

Selected bibliography

Books

Book chapters 
  
   Pdf.
   Preview.
  Details.
   Preview.

Journal articles 
  Pdf.
 
  Pdf.
  Pdf.
  Pdf.
 
  Pdf.
 
 
  Pdf.
  Pdf.
  Pdf.
 
  Pdf.
  Pdf.

References

External links
 A number of papers by Flood are available on his staff page, at the Queensland University of Technology.
 Copies of articles and papers by Flood are available at the XYonline site.

Australian sociologists
Australian feminist writers
Living people
Male feminists
Men's movement
Year of birth missing (living people)
Feminist studies scholars
Men and masculinities scholars
Academic staff of the University of Wollongong
Australian National University alumni
Postmodern feminists